Miss Teen USA 1997, the 15th Miss Teen USA pageant, was televised live from South Padre Island, Texas on 20 August, 1997.  At the conclusion of the final competition, Shelly Moore of Tennessee was crowned by outgoing queen Christie Lee Woods of Texas. 

The pageant was hosted by J. Eddie Peck, with color commentary by Ivanka Trump, daughter of new pageant owner Donald Trump.  This was the first year since 1988 that there was no special entertainment.

Results

Placements

Special awards
Miss Congeniality: Christina Todd (Ohio)
Miss Photogenic: Cristin Duren (Florida)
Style Award: Andria Mullins (Texas)

Historical significance
This was only Colorado's second placement, after Sholone Pakoski made the semi-finals at Miss Teen USA 1990.
Massachusetts placed for the first time since 1991, Virginia and  North Carolina placed for the first time since 1992, and Hawaii placed for the first time since 1993.
North Dakota placed for the second consecutive year, the first time this happened since 1983 and 1984.
Florida became the first state since Maryland (Stacey Harris - 1989 & Mary Ann Cimino - 1990) to win the Miss Photogenic award in two consecutive years.

Scores

Preliminary competition
The following are the contestants' scores in the preliminary competition.

Final Competition Score 

 Winner
 First Runner-up
 Second Runner-up
 Top 6 Finalist
 Top 10 Semifinalist
(#) Rank in each round of competition

Delegates
The Miss Teen USA 1997 delegates were:

 Alabama - Tara Tucker
 Alaska - Laurie Miller
 Arizona - Julie Gulbrandsen
 Arkansas - Brandi Watkins
 California - Kimberly Gloudemans
 Colorado - Amanda Aardsma
 Connecticut - Alita Dawson
 Delaware - Cheryl Crowe
 District of Columbia - Cheri Alexander
 Florida - Cristin Duren
 Georgia - Cheri Wheeler
 Hawaii - Mahana Ka'ahumanu Walters
 Idaho - Kimberly Whiting
 Illinois - Autumn Waterbury
 Indiana - Amber Yoder
 Iowa - Sarah Sucher
 Kansas - Mariah Bergmann
 Kentucky - Kelli Jones
 Louisiana - Sarah Price   
 Maine - Crystal Carlson
 Maryland - Brandi Burkhardt - Age: 18
 Massachusetts - Jessica Gregory
 Michigan - Che'vonne Burton
 Minnesota -  Jamie Duffney
 Mississippi - Cara Lewis
 Missouri - Larissa Meek - Age: 18
 Montana - Cody Strickler
 Nebraska - Natasha Fisher
 Nevada - Kaci Thompson
 New Hampshire - Bonnie Lynn Gagnon
 New Jersey - Lauren Petty
 New Mexico - Vicki Hughes
 New York -  Jessica Ferdinand
 North Carolina - Ali Burr
 North Dakota - Julie Nagle
 Ohio - Christina Todd
 Oklahoma - Amanda Penix - Age: 18
 Oregon - Steve Ficker
 Pennsylvania - Ashley Witner
 Rhode Island - Lauren Alviti
 South Carolina - Caroline Brigman
 South Dakota - Julie Keech
 Tennessee - Shelly Moore - Age: 18
 Texas - Andria Mullins
 Utah - Amy Merrill
 Vermont - Mariah Billado
 Virginia - Kimberly Grigsby
 Washington - Emma DeSilets
 West Virginia - Amanda Burns
 Wisconsin - Allison Schroeder
 Wyoming - Esmeralda Gonzales

Contestant notes
Only a year after giving up her Teen title, Amanda Burns (West Virginia) won the Miss West Virginia USA 1999 title and went on to compete at Miss USA 1999.  It is rare for a contestant to win the Miss pageant so soon after holding the Teen title.
Nine years after competing at Miss Teen USA, Cristin Duren won the Miss Florida USA 2006 title.  She had previously been a semi-finalist at Miss Florida USA 2002, and second runner-up at Miss Alabama USA 2005.  Duren placed fourth runner-up and won the Miss Photogenic award at Miss USA 2006, becoming the first woman to win the Miss Photogenic award at both Miss Teen USA and Miss USA.
Other delegates who later competed at Miss USA were:
Laurie Miller (Alaska) - Miss Alaska USA 2000
Amanda Penix (Oklahoma) - Miss Oklahoma USA 2000
Larissa Meek (Missouri) - Miss Missouri USA 2001 (finalist at Miss USA 2001)
Alita Dawson (Connecticut) - Miss Connecticut USA 2002 (fourth runner-up at Miss USA 2002)
Tara Tucker (Alabama) - Miss Alabama USA 2002 (semi-finalist at Miss USA 2002)
Cheryl Crowe (Delaware) - Miss Delaware USA 2003
Delegates who later competed at Miss America were
Brandi Burkhardt (Maryland) - Miss New York 1999
Che'vonne Burton (Michigan) - Miss Michigan 2000 
Andria Mullins (Texas) competed in Miss USA state pageants for nine years but did not win a title.  She was a non-finalist at Miss Texas USA 1999–2000, made the top fifteen in 2001, placed second runner-up in 2002, and made top twelve in 2003 and 2004.  Mullins then moved to New York, where she placed fourth runner-up at Miss New York USA, to California where she made top ten at Miss California USA 2006.  In her last year of eligibility Mullins again competed in New York where she placed first runner-up to Gloria Almonte, her highest placement.  Fourth runner-up at that pageant was another Miss Teen USA 1997 contestant, Ashley Witner (Pennsylvania).
Larissa Meek (Missouri) starred on the reality television show Average Joe.
Amy Merrill (Utah) was America's National Teenager 1998. 
Lauren Petty (New Jersey) was diagnosed with Hodgkin's lymphoma afterwards, but eventually survived and became an actress, making guest appearances on several TV shows, as well as a temporary contract appearance on General Hospital.

Judges
Kim Alexis
Ron Duguay
Anthony Michael Hall
Bridget Hall
Oribe
Kerri Strug

References

External links
Official website

1997
1997 in the United States
1997 beauty pageants
1997 in Texas